The 1973 Kansas State Wildcats football team represented Kansas State University in the 1973 NCAA Division I football season.  The team's head football coach was Vince Gibson.  The Wildcats played their home games in KSU Stadium.  1973 saw the wildcats finish with a record of 5–6 overall and a 2–5 record in Big Eight Conference play.

Schedule

References

Kansas State
Kansas State Wildcats football seasons
Kansas State Wildcats football